Roberto Benitez (born July 30, 1980 in Brooklyn, New York) is a professional boxer from the United States.

Amateur career
Benitez was a highly decorated amateur boxer, and was a four-time United States Amateur champion, winning at Flyweight (1999, 2000, 2001) and Bantamweight (2004). Benitez also won two National Golden Gloves title at Flyweight (1997, 1999).

Amateur highlights
In 1998 won the Goodwill Games Gold Medal.
Won the Olympic trials in the 125 lbs division in 2004 but failed to qualify for the Olympic games.
Won a gold medal in the 1996 US Junior Olympics at 112 lbs.
Won a gold medal in 1996 at Junior Olympics International tournament at 112 lbs.
Won a bronze medal in the 1997 United States championships at 112 lbs.
Won a gold medal in the 1997 US Junior championships at 112 lbs.
Won a bronze medal in the 1997 Muhammad Ali Cup at 112 lbs.
Gold medalist in the 1997 National Golden Gloves at 112 lbs.
Won a bronze medal in the 1998 United States championships at 112 lbs.
Won a silver medal in the 1998 Goodwill games at 112 lbs.
Won a gold medal in the 1999 National Golden Gloves at 112 lbs.
Won a gold medal in the 2000 United States championships, beating Jose Navarro and Gabriel Elizondo.
Competed in the Americas Olympic qualifiers representing the Dominican Republic, but losses to Andrew Koomer and Omar Narvaez meant he failed to qualify.
Won 2001 United States Challenge tournament at 112 lbs. Won gold medal in the 2001 United States championships at 112 lbs. Competed in the 2001 World championships.
Won a silver medal in the 2002 United States championships at 112 lbs, losing to Raul Martinez.
Won a silver medal in the 2002 National Golden Gloves at 112 lbs, losing to Ron Siler.
Won a gold medal in the 2003 American Boxing Classics Tournament at 112 lbs.
Won a silver medal in the 2003 United States championships at 112 lbs, losing to Raul Martinez.
Won a bronze medal in the 2003 National Golden Gloves at 112 lbs, losing to Ron Siler.
Won a gold medal in the 2004 championships at 119 lbs.

Olympics
Benitez competed in the 2000 US Olympic Trials, beating Jose Aguiniga, Rasheem Jefferson, losing to Jose Navarro, beating Aguiniaga again but losing to Jose Navarro in a box-off.
Benitez won the 2004 US Olympic trials at 119 lbs beating Miguel Albares, Eric Hunter, Sergio Ramos and Torrence Daniel then beating Hunter in a box-off. Benitez then lost in the Americas Olympic qualifiers to Juan Manuel Lopez at 54 kg.

Pro career
Benitez turned professional in 2005 and won his first five bouts.  He then was absent from the ring before returning in late 2009 with a victory.

References

 

1980 births
Living people
Boxers from New York City
Bantamweight boxers
Sportspeople from Brooklyn
National Golden Gloves champions
Winners of the United States Championship for amateur boxers
American male boxers
Competitors at the 1998 Goodwill Games